Henk van Tilburg (2 December 1898 – 14 July 1985) was a Dutch footballer. He played in nine matches for the Netherlands national football team from 1921 to 1923.

References

External links
 

1898 births
1985 deaths
Dutch footballers
Netherlands international footballers
Place of birth missing
Association footballers not categorized by position